Skedee is a town in Pawnee County, Oklahoma, United States. The population was 51 at the 2010 census, a 50 percent decline from the figure of 102 recorded in 2000.

History 
Skedee was known as "Lemert", a name which referred to the local landowners, the Lemert family. In 1902, when the post office opened, the town was renamed "Skedee", after the Skidi Pawnee.

In 1900–1904, the Eastern Oklahoma Railway built a railway line through Skedee. Steam engines stopped at Crystal Creek for water. A cotton gin and a grain elevator were also built.

The rail line was destroyed by flooding in 1957. The Skedee post office closed in 1963.

In the 21st Century, Skedee has become a commuter town, with employed residents commuting to work in Stillwater and Pawnee.

Points of interest

A 1926 statue of Osage Chief Bacon Rind and Colonel Ellsworth Walters (1866/7-1946), a Skedee resident who was an oil lease auctioneer for the Osage Nation in the 1920s, stands in the main intersection of the town.

Geography
Skedee is located at  (36.380892, -96.703911).

Demographics

As of the census of 2000, there were 102 people, 38 households, and 22 families residing in the town. There were 41 housing units at an average density of 309.1 per square mile (121.8/km2). The racial makeup of the town was 96.08% White, 1.96% Native American, and 1.96% from two or more races.

There were 38 households, out of which 39.5% had children under the age of 18 living with them, 55.3% were married couples living together, 2.6% had a female householder with no husband present, and 39.5% were non-families. 34.2% of all households were made up of individuals, and 28.9% had someone living alone who was 65 years of age or older. The average household size was 2.68 and the average family size was 3.61.

In the town, the population was spread out, with 31.4% under the age of 18, 10.8% from 18 to 24, 31.4% from 25 to 44, 12.7% from 45 to 64, and 13.7% who were 65 years of age or older. The median age was 28 years. For every 100 females, there were 100.0 males. For every 100 females age 18 and over, there were 75.0 males.

The median income for a household in the town was $17,188, and the median income for a family was $25,938. Males had a median income of $25,938 versus $11,944 for females. The per capita income for the town was $9,192. There were 24.1% of families and 28.7% of the population living below the poverty line, including 35.5% of under eighteens and 27.8% of those over 64.

References

External links 
 Skedee feature on Abandoned Oklahoma, photos

Towns in Pawnee County, Oklahoma
Towns in Oklahoma